Abdol Khakhi may refer to:
 Abdol Khakhi-ye Olya
 Abdol Khakhi-ye Sofla